Sopronbánfalva, also known as Bánfalva, is a former village part of the city of Sopron, Hungary, since 1950. Before 1945, the village had 3,304 inhabitants, with the majority being ethnic Germans. However, many were deported, remaining only approximately 700 inhabitants after the event. This happened due to the desire to, among other things, secure the border with Austria.

See also
 1921 Sopron plebiscite

References

External links

Sopron
Former municipalities of Hungary